Abandoned Mine, also known as The Mine, is a 2012 horror film written and directed by Jeff Chamberlain. The film premiered in Sandy, Utah in September 2012 and had a limited release on August 15, 2013.

Plot
Five friends explore a supposedly haunted mine to celebrate Halloween, exactly one-hundred years after a family was murdered in the mine. They soon find to their horror that the ghostly rumors may be true as they fight for survival.

Cast
 Alexa Vega as Sharon, Brad's new girlfriend
 Reiley McClendon as Brad, the trickster
 Saige Thompson as Laurie, Brad's ex-girlfriend
 Charan Prabhakar as Ethan, an Indian friend of Laurie
 Adam Hendershott as Jim, Brad's best friend
 Valerie C. Walker as Kelly, a store clerk
 Joseph Batzel as Jarvis, the ghost of the mine
 Jordan Chamberlain as Store customer, a customer at Sharon's store
 Cody Walker as Thomas, an always-happy store clerk

Development
The film was originally titled The Mine, before the title was changed to Abandoned Mine. Filming occurred in Utah and California.

The first clips from the film were revealed on August 7, 2013. The first poster was revealed on June 18, 2013. The film was distributed by Gravitas Entertainment. The trailer was released on June 17, 2013, along with information about the release date.

Reception
The Los Angeles Times panned the film, writing that it was "all that its title promises: something generic and empty, with the sense that much has been left behind." The Film Journal was more positive, and wrote that "it delivers a handful of creepy moments and the opening-credits montage of old newspaper accounts of the Jarvis family's fate is genuinely disturbing."

References

External links
 
 
 

2012 films
2012 horror films